Michel Abramowicz is a French photographer and cinematographer.

Career
He studied at the Paris Diderot University. Since then he has shot feature films, commercials and video clips. The DVD version of Taken was distributed with a feature commentary to which he contributed.

Selected filmography
 1990: La fille des collines
 1991: Annabelle partagée
 1993: Une journée chez ma mère
 1993: 
 1995: État des lieux
 1997: La ballade de Titus
 2000: Capitães de Abril
 2002: Sueurs
 2003: Michel Vaillant
 2005: Empire of the Wolves
 2007: Ha-Sodot
 2008: Taken
 2008: Bonjour Sagan
 2010: From Paris with Love
 2010: The Matchmaker
 2011: The Thing
 2016: Past Life
 2019: The Courier

External links

References

1950 births
French cinematographers
Living people